The Babes in the Wood murders is a name which has been used in the media to refer to a child murder case in which the bodies of two brothers, Derek and David D'Alton, also known as David and Derek Bousquet, were found concealed in woodland at Stanley Park in Vancouver, British Columbia, Canada.  The Vancouver Police Department identified the brothers publicly on February 15, 2022.

Discovery
The remains of two male victims (murdered about 1947) were discovered in Stanley Park, Vancouver, British Columbia, Canada on Wednesday, January 14, 1953. Police determined that a hatchet found at the crime scene, which was of a type commonly used by shingle weavers and lathers, had been used to kill the boys by striking them in the head. Their corpses had been arranged so that they were lying down in a straight line, with each boy's soles facing the other's, and then concealed with a woman's rain cape. The investigation was hampered when the medical examiner concluded that one victim was female. A DNA test conducted in 1998 proved that both victims were male and that they were brothers; they were between the ages of six and ten when they died.

Identification 
In 2018, detectives were planning on using consumer DNA databases such as Ancestry.com and 23andMe to research the identities of the victims.

This investigation came to a close in 2022, when the children were identified via forensic genealogy as Derek (born February 27, 1940) and David D'Alton (born June 24, 1941), the sons of Eileen Bousquet, who died in 1996. The investigation into their homicide is ongoing.

See also
 List of unsolved murders (1900–1979)

References

External links

History of Vancouver
People murdered in British Columbia
1953 in Canada
1947 murders in Canada
Axe murder
Murdered Canadian children
Unsolved murders in Canada